The James Oviatt Building, commonly referred to as The Oviatt Building, is an Art Deco highrise in Downtown Los Angeles located on Olive Street, half a block south of 6th St. and Pershing Square.  In 1983, the Oviatt Building was listed in the National Register of Historic Places. It is also designated as a Los Angeles Historic-Cultural Monument.

History 
 

The building is named after James Zera Oviatt (1888-1974) who, in 1909, came from Salt Lake City to Los Angeles to work as a  window dresser  at C.C. Desmond's Department Store. In 1912, Oviatt and a colleague, hat salesman Frank Baird Alexander, launched their partnership in men's clothing as the Alexander & Oviatt haberdashery, at 209 West Fourth Street in downtown Los Angeles. Their 'silent partner' was Frank Shaver Allen, a wealthy and once socially prominent architect whose career had been destroyed by a sex scandal several years earlier.

During annual summer buying trips to Europe, Oviatt found stylish clothing to bring back to his prospering Los Angeles store. With the emergence of French Art Deco in the 1920s, Oviatt found the architectural style that would embody the interior design of his 1928 James Oviatt Building and its penthouse. In the 1950s and ‘60s, he funded white supremacist militias and anti-Semitic groups associated with Wesley A. Swift and the Ku Klux Klan, and distributed hate literature by mail to his business’s charge customers. Oviatt’s actions caused a public outcry and led customers to boycott his clothing store, causing it to close in 1966. 

The Oviatt Building was designed by the Los Angeles architectural firm of Walker & Eisen.  Excavation for the Oviatt Building's construction was begun in August 1927; the building was completed in May 1928. Its furnishings included a 12-ton illuminated glass cornice and glass arcade ceiling by architect Ferdinand Chanut and glassmaker Gaëtan Jeannin. René Lalique designed and created the molded glass elevator door panels, front and side doors, chandeliers, and a large panel clock. Many tons of 'Napoleon' marble and a massive, three-faced tower clock with chimes (manufactured by the pioneering electric clockmaker, Ateliers Brillié Frères ) were imported from France.

In popular culture
A feature-length documentary on the Oviatt Building's history was directed by Seth Shulman and written/produced by Marc Chevalier in 2008.

In 2015, the exterior of the Cicada was used as the exterior for the fictional Hotel Cortez on American Horror Story: Hotel.

The Cicada featured in various films such as Bruce Almighty and the Oscar-winning Mank.

See also
 List of Registered Historic Places in Los Angeles
 List of Los Angeles Historic-Cultural Monuments in Downtown Los Angeles

References

External links

 Oviatt Building documentary

Skyscraper office buildings in Los Angeles
Buildings and structures in Downtown Los Angeles
Los Angeles Historic-Cultural Monuments
Commercial buildings on the National Register of Historic Places in Los Angeles
Office buildings completed in 1927
1927 establishments in California
Commercial buildings completed in 1928
Art Deco architecture in California